Alexander Joseph Nagel (born 13 September 1945 in New York City) is an American mathematician, specializing in harmonic analysis, functions of several complex variables, and linear partial differential equations.

Biography
He received in 1966 from Harvard University his bachelor's degree and in 1971 from Columbia University his PhD under the supervision of Lipman Bers with thesis Sheaves of Holomorphic Functions with Boundary Conditions and Sheaf Cohomology in Banach Algebras. At the University of Wisconsin, Madison, Nagel was from 1970 to 1972 an instructor, from 1972 to 1974 an assistant professor, from 1974 to 1977 an associate professor, and from 1977 to 2012 a full professor, retiring in December 2012 as professor emeritus. He was chair of the mathematics department in 1991–1993 and in 2011–2012, and Associate Dean for Natural Sciences in the College of Letters and Science in 1993–1998.

He was a Guggenheim Fellow for the academic year 1987–1988. He shared with Stephen Wainger the Stefan Bergman Prize for 2007–2008. Nagel was elected a Fellow of the American Association for the Advancement of Science in 2009 and a Fellow of the American Mathematical Society in 2012.

Alexander Nagel, the elder son of the philosopher Ernest Nagel, is the brother of the physicist Sidney R. Nagel.

Selected publications

Articles
with Walter Rudin and Joel H. Shapiro: 
with Elias M. Stein and Stephen Wainger: 
with Joaquim Bruna and S. Wainger: 
with Jean-Pierre Rosay, E. M. Stein, and S. Wainger: 
 with Der-Chen Chang and E. M. Stein: 
with Michael Christ, E. M. Stein, and S. Wainger:

Books
with E. M. Stein:

References

External links

20th-century American mathematicians
21st-century American mathematicians
Harvard University alumni
Columbia University alumni
University of Wisconsin–Madison faculty
Fellows of the American Association for the Advancement of Science
Fellows of the American Mathematical Society
Complex analysts
Mathematical analysts
1945 births
Living people
Scientists from New York City
Mathematicians from New York (state)